

Siegfried Verhein (1 October 1897 – 30 June 1963) was a German general in the Wehrmacht during World War II. He was a recipient of the Knight's Cross of the Iron Cross of  Nazi Germany.

Verhein surrendered to the Red Army in the course of the Soviet 1945 Zemland Offensive. Convicted as a war criminal in the Soviet Union, he was held until 1955.

Awards and decorations

 Knight's Cross of the Iron Cross on 28 February 1945 as Generalmajor and leader of a Kampfgruppe in the 551. Volks-Grenadier-Division

References

Citations

Bibliography

 

1897 births
1963 deaths
Lieutenant generals of the German Army (Wehrmacht)
German Army personnel of World War I
Prussian Army personnel
Recipients of the clasp to the Iron Cross, 1st class
Recipients of the Knight's Cross of the Iron Cross
German prisoners of war in World War II held by the Soviet Union
People from the Province of Pomerania
People from Vorpommern-Greifswald
Military personnel from Mecklenburg-Western Pomerania
German Army generals of World War II